The Chimalapas montane forests is a tropical moist broadleaf forest ecoregion in southern Mexico. It includes the montane tropical forests of the Chimalapas region on the boundary of Chiapas and Oaxaca.

Geography
The Chimalapas region is in the Isthmus of Tehuantepec, and the region's mountains form part of the divide between Mexico's Pacific watersheds to the south and Gulf of Mexico watersheds to the north. The montane forests are bounded by the lowland Petén–Veracruz moist forests on the north. The Chiapas Depression dry forests lie to the northeast. The montane forests adjoin the Sierra Madre de Oaxaca pine–oak forests on the west, and the Central American pine–oak forests to the east. The Southern Pacific dry forests lie to the south between the mountains and the Pacific Ocean.

Climate
The climate of the ecoregion is tropical and humid. The forests have a cooler climate than the surrounding lowlands, and average annual temperatures decrease with elevation.

Flora
The characteristic plant community is montane tropical evergreen moist forest, also known cloud forest.

Fauna
281 species of birds have been recorded in the ecoregion. They include the solitary eagle (Harpyhaliaetus solitarius), great curassow (Crax rubra), highland guan (Penelopina nigra), wood stork (Mycteria americana), keel-billed motmot (Electron carinatum), southern mealy amazon (Amazona farinosa), and chestnut-headed oropendola (Psarocolius wagleri).

Protected areas
A 2017 assessment found 278 km², or 13%, of the ecoregion is in protected areas. They include 
El Cordón del Retén Voluntary Conservation Area (153.29 km²).

See also
 List of ecoregions in Mexico
 Chimalapas territory conflict
 Selva Zoque

External links

References

Ecoregions of Mexico
Montane forests
Natural history of Chiapas
Natural history of Oaxaca
Neotropical tropical and subtropical moist broadleaf forests
Important Bird Areas of Mexico
Cloud forests of Mexico